Leonta Rheams (born August 1, 1976) is an American former football defensive tackle. He played professionally with the New England Patriots of the National Football League (NFL) and the Memphis Maniax of the XFL.  Rheams played college football for the University of Houston Cougars. In the NFL, he appeared in six games during his only season in the league and made two tackles, one unassisted. In the XFL, he finished sixth on the Maniax with 21 tackles (7 unassisted) with one sack.

References

1976 births
Living people
American football defensive tackles
Memphis Maniax players
New England Patriots players
Players of American football from Texas
Sportspeople from Tyler, Texas
Houston Cougars football players